Stjernehallen is an indoor ice hockey arena located in Fredrikstad, Norway. The capacity of the arena is 2,473 and was opened in 1970. It is the home arena of Stjernen ice hockey team.

References

External links

Sports venues in Fredrikstad
Indoor arenas in Norway
Indoor ice hockey venues in Norway
Stjernen Hockey